In Mandaeism, a dmuta or dmut is a spiritual counterpart or "mirror image" in the World of Light. People, spirits, and places are often considered to have both earthly and heavenly counterparts (dmuta) that can dynamically interact with each other. A few examples include:

The heavenly Adam kasia corresponding to the earthly Adam pagria
The heavenly Piriawis (or "Great Jordan") corresponding to earthly yardnas (rivers)
Abatur Rama ("Lofty Abatur") corresponding to Abatur Muzania ("Abatur of the Scales")

A dmuta dwells in the Mshunia Kushta, a section of the World of Light.

Merging of the soul
A successful masiqta merges the incarnate soul and spirit from the Earth (Tibil) into a new merged entity in the World of Light called the ʿuṣṭuna. The ʿuṣṭuna can then reunite with its heavenly, non-incarnate counterpart (or spiritual image), the dmuta, in the World of Light, where it will reside in the world of ideal counterparts called the Mšunia Kušṭa (similar to Plato's idea of the hyperuranion).

Parallels
Similarly, the Qur'an (36:36, 51:49, etc.) mentions that God created everything in "pairs." Related concepts in other religions include yin and yang in Taoism, and the Yazidi belief of there being both a heavenly and earthly Lalish.

Philosophical parallels include Plato's theory of forms.

See also
Dmut Kušṭa
Laufa
World of Light
Mandaean cosmology
Image of God in Christianity
Correspondence (theology)
Theory of forms in Platonism
Hyperuranion in Platonism
Archetype
Qareen in Islam
Doppelgänger
Etiäinen
Shadow (psychology)

References

Mandaean philosophical concepts
Dichotomies
Mandaic words and phrases
Archetypes
Esoteric cosmology
Mandaean cosmology
Counterparts